Lirik Vishi (born 13 June 2001) is a Swiss professional footballer who plays as a midfielder for Yverdon.

Club career
Born in Langenthal, Vishi played his early football by local club Solothurn and moved to the youth section of FC Basel in January 2012. Since then he has passed through all the junior levels for his club. In the 2019–20 season he made a total of 13 appearances with the U21 team in the Swiss Promotion League, the third tier of the Swiss football league system. On 21 June 2020, Vishi made his debut for the club's first team coming on as a substitute in the second half, but the team was beaten 2–1 loss by FC Luzern.

On 1 July 2020 to the start of their 2020–21 season the club announced that they had signed a two year professional contract with Vishi.

On 9 August 2022, Vishi moved to Yverdon on a two-year deal.

Personal life
Vishi is of Kosovan descent.

Career statistics

Club

Notes

References

2001 births
Swiss people of Kosovan descent
People from Langenthal
Sportspeople from the canton of Bern
Living people
Swiss men's footballers
Switzerland youth international footballers
Association football midfielders
FC Basel players
Yverdon-Sport FC players
Swiss Promotion League players
Swiss Super League players
Swiss Challenge League players